Allsvenskan 1990, part of the 1990 Swedish football season, was the 66th Allsvenskan season played. IFK Göteborg won the league ahead of runners-up IFK Norrköping, while IK Brage, Örgryte IS and Hammarby IF were relegated.

Overview
The league was contested by 12 teams, with IFK Göteborg winning the league and the Swedish championship after the play-offs.

League table

Results

Allsvenskan play-offs 
The 1990 Allsvenskan play-offs was the ninth and final edition of the competition. The four best placed teams from Allsvenskan  qualified to the competition. Allsvenskan champions IFK Göteborg won the competition and the Swedish championship after defeating IFK Norrköping who finished as runners-up in the league.

Semi-finals

First leg

Second leg

Final

Season statistics

Top scorers

Footnotes

References 

Online

Allsvenskan seasons
Swed
Swed
1